Mannophryne lamarcai is a species of frog in the family Aromobatidae.
It is endemic to Venezuela and inhabits a narrow altitudinal band in the Ziruma mountains between the states of Zulia, Falcón and Lara.
Its natural habitats are subtropical or tropical moist montane forest and rivers.
It is threatened by habitat loss.

References 

lamarcai
Amphibians of Venezuela
Endemic fauna of Venezuela
Taxonomy articles created by Polbot
Amphibians described in 1999